The year 2009 was the 38th year after the independence of Bangladesh. It was also the first year of the second term of the government of Sheikh Hasina.

Incumbents

 President: Iajuddin Ahmed (until 6 January), Zillur Rahman (starting 6 January)
 Prime Minister: Fakhruddin Ahmed (acting) (until 6 January), Sheikh Hasina (starting 6 January)
 Chief Justice: Md. Ruhul Amin (until 23 December), Md. Tafazzul Islam (starting 23 December)

Demography

Climate

Economy

Note: For the year 2009 average official exchange rate for BDT was 69.04 per US$.

Events
 
 19 February - ML Happy sunk near Barisal City. At least 39 people died in the sinking.
 25 February – Mutiny staged by Bangladesh Rifles, a paramilitary force at BDR HQ, Pilkhana, Dhaka. The rebelling BDR soldiers took over the BDR headquarters in Pilkhana, killing the BDR Director-General Shakil Ahmed along with 56 other army officers and 17 civilians. They also fired on civilians, held many of their officers and their families hostage, vandalised property and looted valuables. By the second day, unrest had spread to 12 other towns and cities. The mutiny ended as the mutineers surrendered their arms and released the hostages after a series of discussions and negotiations with the government.
 13 March – A fire at Bashundhara City shopping mall kills 7 and injures 50 more. The blaze started around 1:30 pm, after Friday prayers, on one of the top floors. Most of the offices were empty, as Friday is the first day of the weekend in Bangladesh. A security guard died as he jumped off the top of the building to escape the fire. Seventeen others were injured. The chief security officer of the building was rescued from the roof top by a Bangladesh Air Force Bell-212 helicopter.
 17 April - Police arrest 31 suspected Hizb ut-Tahrir members for planning terrorism.
 25 May – Cyclone Aila ravages the south-west coast.
 27 November - A ferry named MV Coco-4 sunk near Bhola Island, killing 75 people, out of more than a thousand on board, with several dozen more reported missing.
 4 December - Another ferry sunk in Daira river located in Mithamain Upazila, Kishoreganj District killing at least 47 people.

Awards and recognitions

International recognition
 1 May - Bangladeshi attorney and environmentalist Rizwana Hasan was awarded the Goldman Environmental Prize in 2009.
 12 August – Muhammad Yunus, founder of Grameen Bank, was awarded the Presidential Medal of Freedom by the US US President Barack Obama.

Independence Day Award

Ekushey Padak
 Burhanuddin Khan Jahangir (education)
 Syed Anwar Hossain (research)
 Mahbub Ul Alam Choudhury (language movement)
 Ashraf Uz Zaman Khan (journalism)
 Begum Bilkis Nasir Uddin (journalism)
 Manik Chandra Saha (journalism)
 Humayun Kabir Balu (journalism)
 Selina Hossain (literature)
 Shamsuzzaman Khan (research)
 Qazi Kholiquzzaman Ahmad (poverty reduction)
 Mohammad Rafi Khan (social service)
 Monsur Ul Karim (fine arts)
 Ramendu Majumdar (theatre)

Sports
 Kabaddi:
 Bangladesh won bronze medal in Kabaddi in Asian Inddor Games.
 Football:
 Bangladesh hosted the SAFF Championship from 4 to 13 December. Bangladesh lost to India in the semi finals.
 Abahani Limited Dhaka defended B. League title.
 Cricket:

 The Bangladesh cricket team started the year with on-going test series against Sri Lanka. They lost their first test match of the year.
 After the test series, Sri Lanka and Zimbabwe joined host Bangladesh in a Tri-Series. Bangladesh became runner-up while Sri Lanka became Champion. Shakib Al Hasan from Bangladesh was judged the Player of the Series.
 The Bangladesh cricket team toured the West Indies during the 2009 international season, from 3 July 2009 to 2 August 2009. The tour consisted of a two-Test series, a three-ODI series, and one Twenty20 International. Due to industrial action between the West Indies Cricket Board and the West Indies Players' Association, the West Indies fielded a weak team which was missing its entire First XI during the series. Bangladesh easily accounted for the weakened West Indian team, winning the Test series 2–0 and the ODI series 3–0. In the Test series, Bangladesh recorded only its second and third Test wins ever, its first and second Test wins as the touring side, its first series win as the touring side, and its first Test series whitewash. In the ODI series, it was also Bangladesh's first series win as the touring side against a Test nation, and its first series whitewash against a Test nation. The West Indies won the Twenty20 match.
 Later, the Bangladesh cricket team toured Zimbabwe. They played five One Day Internationals against Zimbabwe and won the series 4-1.
 The Zimbabwe Cricket Team again toured Bangladesh from 27 October to 5 November. The tour consisted of 5 ODIs. Bangladesh won the series 4-1.

Deaths
 25 February – Md Shawkat Imam, army colonel (b. 1961)
 9 May – M. A. Wazed Miah, nuclear scientist and husband of Prime Minister Sheikh Hasina (b. 1942)
 17 June – Gaziul Haque, language activist and author (b. 1929)
 12 September – Shah Abdul Karim, baul musician (b. 1916)
 3 December – Swadesh Bose, economist (b. 1928)

See also 
 2000s in Bangladesh
 List of Bangladeshi films of 2009
 Timeline of Bangladeshi history

References